Dog Chow is a name brand of dog food marketed and manufactured by Nestlé Purina PetCare. The brand's dry dog food is offered worldwide, in numerous formulas. Introduced in 1957, It has since expanded its brand offerings to include products for puppies, elderly dogs, and dogs needing a weight maintenance formula as well as extended to other types of pet food, including Puppy Chow, Cat Chow, and Kitten Chow.

Due to the brand's growing popularity, a string of commercials were aired in Canada in 1962. The commercials introduced Jim Henson's brainchild, Rowlf the Dog.

References

External links
Dog Chow Brand Dog Food
Purina Dog Food

Dog food brands
Nestlé brands
Ralston Purina products
Products introduced in 1957